In 2017, Karsten Søndergaard from Venstre would secure the party's 3rd consecutive term holding the mayor's position in the municipality.

In this election, a new local party called Lokallisten Ny Egedal would see great success. They would mange to win 4 seats, and become the third largest party. As no bloc had a majority, they could become decisive in deciding who'd become the next mayor. At first, it sounded as Karsten Søndergaard could continue as mayor. However, the Conservatives decided that they could see more influence if they made a constitutinal agreement having Vicky Holst Rasmussen from the Social Democrats as the new mayor. Therefore, the Social Democrats would be able to hold the mayor's position in the municipality for the first time.

Electoral system
For elections to Danish municipalities, a number varying from 9 to 31 are chosen to be elected to the municipal council. The seats are then allocated using the D'Hondt method and a closed list proportional representation.
Egedal Municipality had 21 seats in 2021

Unlike in Danish General Elections, in elections to municipal councils, electoral alliances are allowed.

Electoral alliances  

Electoral Alliance 1

Electoral Alliance 2

Electoral Alliance 3

Results

Notes

References 

Egedal